Summit Lake may refer to several places:

Lakes

Canada 
 Summit Lake (Saskatchewan), a lake in Saskatchewan
 Summit Lake (Alberta), a lake in Alberta

 List of lakes named Summit Lake in British Columbia (includes some details about several other Summit Lakes in British Columbia, in addition to those listed immediately below)
 Alta Lake (British Columbia) or Summit Lake
 Gates Lake or Summit Lake, Southern Interior
 Summit Lake (Crooked River), Central Interior
 Summit Lake (Vancouver Island)
 Ontario
 Algoma District
 Summit Lake (Goudreau, Ontario)
 Summit Lake (Josephine Creek)
 Summit Lake (Kabinakagami River)
 Summit Lake (Lochalsh River)
 Summit Lake (Frontenac County)
 Summit Lake (Kenora District)
 Summit Lakes (Ontario), Nipissing District
 Summit Lake (Rainy River District)
 Summit Lake (Sudbury District)
 Summit Lake (Thunder Bay District)
 Summit Lake (Timiskaming District)
 Nunavut
 Summit Lake (Akshayuk Pass, Auyuittuq National Park)

United States 
 Summit Lake (Alaska), several lakes, including:
 Summit Lake (Chugach National Forest)
 Summit Lake (Paxson, Alaska)
 Summit Lake (Willow, Alaska)
 Summit Lake (Reading Peak, Shasta County), California

 Summit Lake (Clear Creek County, Colorado)
 Summit Lake (Kandiyohi County, Minnesota)
 Summit Lake (Murray County, Minnesota)
 Summit Lake (Edmeston, Otsego County, New York)
 Summit Lake (Springfield, Otsego County, New York)
 Summit Lake (Oregon), several lakes
 Summit Lake (Washington)
 Summit Lake (West Virginia)
 Summit Lake (Langlade County, Wisconsin)

Places
 Summit Lake, British Columbia
 Summit Lake, Maryland
 Summit Lake, Minnesota
 Summit Lake, Wisconsin
 Summit Lake camp

See also
 Lake Summit, Winter Haven, Florida
 Summit Lake Park, Colorado
 Summit Lake Provincial Park, British Columbia
 Summit Lake Ski Area, Nakusp, British Columbia
 Summit Lake State Park, Henry County, Indiana